Reza Taghipour Anvari (born 1957, in Maragheh) is an Iranian conservative politician who was the Minister of Communications from 2009 to 2012. He was elected as a member of Tehran City Council in 2013 local elections.

Censorship 
Taghipour was sanctioned by the European Union on 23 March 2012 for excessive censorship activity.

References 

Living people
University of Bordeaux alumni
Administrators of the Iranian Space Agency
Government ministers of Iran
1957 births
People from Maragheh
Tehran Councillors 2013–2017
Popular Front of Islamic Revolution Forces politicians
Iranian industrial engineers
Alliance of Builders of Islamic Iran politicians
Islamic Revolutionary Guard Corps personnel of the Iran–Iraq War
Front of Islamic Revolution Stability politicians